Mladen Kašćelan (Cyrillic: Mлaдeн Kaшћeлaн, born 13 February 1983) is a Montenegrin footballer who plays as midfielder in Russia for FC Baltika Kaliningrad.

Playing career

Club
In August 2011, he was loaned to ŁKS Łódź on a one-year deal.

In January 2012, he was loaned to PFC Ludogorets Razgrad on a half-year deal.

International
Kašćelan made his debut for Montenegro in a June 2009 FIFA World Cup qualification match away against Cyprus and has earned a total of 25 caps, scoring no goals. His final international was a May 2016 friendly match against Turkey.

Personal life
Mladen is married to Serbian model, Marijana Križanović Kašćelan. They got married on June 5 in the luxurious hotel "Splendid" in Montenegro. Many people attending the wedding compared it with the royal wedding that marked the year.

Honours

Club
 Jagiellonia Białystok
Polish SuperCup:
Winner: 2010
 Ludogorets Razgrad
A PFG:
Champion: 2011-12
Bulgarian Cup:
Winner: 2011-12

References

External links
 
 
 

1983 births
Living people
People from Kotor
Association football midfielders
Serbia and Montenegro footballers
Montenegrin footballers
Montenegro international footballers
FK Bokelj players
Borussia Dortmund II players
Karlsruher SC II players
Karlsruher SC players
OFK Beograd players
FK Voždovac players
ŁKS Łódź players
Stal Głowno players
FC Karpaty Lviv players
Jagiellonia Białystok players
PFC Ludogorets Razgrad players
Panthrakikos F.C. players
FC Arsenal Tula players
FC Tosno players
FC Tambov players
FC Baltika Kaliningrad players
Second League of Serbia and Montenegro players
Regionalliga players
2. Bundesliga players
Oberliga (football) players
First League of Serbia and Montenegro players
Serbian SuperLiga players
Ekstraklasa players
III liga players
II liga players
Ukrainian Premier League players
First Professional Football League (Bulgaria) players
Super League Greece players
Russian First League players
Russian Premier League players
Serbia and Montenegro expatriate footballers
Expatriate footballers in Germany
Serbia and Montenegro expatriate sportspeople in Germany
Montenegrin expatriate footballers
Expatriate footballers in Serbia
Montenegrin expatriate sportspeople in Serbia
Expatriate footballers in Poland
Montenegrin expatriate sportspeople in Poland
Expatriate footballers in Ukraine
Montenegrin expatriate sportspeople in Ukraine
Expatriate footballers in Bulgaria
Montenegrin expatriate sportspeople in Bulgaria
Expatriate footballers in Greece
Montenegrin expatriate sportspeople in Greece
Expatriate footballers in Russia
Montenegrin expatriate sportspeople in Russia